Weightlifting at the 1992 Summer Paralympics consisted of five events for men.

Participating nations 
There were 44 male competitors representing 18 nations.

Medal summary

Medal table 
There were 15 medal winners representing eight nations.

Men's events 
Sources:

References 

 

1992 Summer Paralympics events
1992
Paralympics